Clavus obliquatus is a species of sea snail, a marine gastropod mollusk in the family Drilliidae.

Description
The length of the shell attains 33 mm.

The shell is yellowish brown, within and without, with a narrow lighter band on the periphery, and sometimes a row of white dots on the ribs a little below the middle of the body whorl. There are a few revolving striae at the base of the shell.

Distribution
This marine species is endemic to Australia and occurs off Queensland; it has also been found off the Philippines.

References

 Reeve, L.A. 1845. Monograph of the genus Pleurotoma. pls 20–33 in Reeve, L.A. (ed). Conchologia Iconica. London : L. Reeve & Co. Vol. 1. 
 Wells F.E. (1991) A revision of the Recent Australian species of the turrid genera Clavus, Plagiostropha, and Tylotiella (Mollusca: Gastropoda). Journal of the Malacological Society of Australia 12: 1–33.
 Wilson, B. 1994. Australian Marine Shells. Prosobranch Gastropods. Kallaroo, WA : Odyssey Publishing Vol. 2 370 pp.

External links

obliquatus
Gastropods described in 1845
Gastropods of Australia